Night Train is a 1998 Irish romantic thriller directed by John Lynch (as his debut feature), starring John Hurt and Brenda Blethyn, released in the United Kingdom on August 28, 1998. Lynch was nominated for a Crystal Star for the film at the Brussels International Film Festival, and Hurt won the Best Actor award at the Verona Love Screens Film Festival for his performance.

Plot 
The film follows Michael Poole (Hurt), an ex-prisoner with a passion for electric trains and the Orient Express. In his attempts at starting a new life, he finds refuge in the house of Mrs. Mooney, a possessive old lady (Pauline Flanagan). Things begin to get complicated when he falls for the lady's daughter (Brenda Blethyn), and he faces the ultimate question of catching the night train or taking charge of his life like an adult.

Cast
John Hurt — Michael Poole 
Brenda Blethyn — Alice Mooney
Pauline Flanagan — Mrs. Mooney 
Rynagh O'Grady — Winnie
Peter Caffrey — Walter
Paul Roe — Blake
Lorcan Cranitch — Billy 
Cathy White — Liz
Kevin McHugh — Detective Cassidy 
Aaron Harris — Sgt. Charlie

Reception 
Variety's Glenn Lovell wrote that while the film was a "good-hearted" mix of romance and reflection, the film "eventually jumps the tracks, derailed by jarring tone shifts and homestretch absurdities."

References

External links

1998 films
1998 romantic drama films
1990s thriller films
1990s romantic thriller films
Irish thriller drama films
British thriller drama films
1990s English-language films
1990s British films